Chersotis rectangula is a moth of the family Noctuidae. It is the type species of the genus Chersotis.

Description
Chersotis rectangula has a wingspan of 29–37 mm. These moths are generally greyish-brown, with not conspicuous dark markings.

Biology
Adults are found from late June to mid-September. Larvae are polyphagous and feed on various herbaceous plants, especially on Melilotus species and Vicia species.

Distribution
This species is present in the southern part of central Europe (Poland, the Czech Republic, Slovakia, Austria, Italy, Greece, Romania and Hungary), in SW Siberia, Altai, Turkmenistan, Caucasus, Armenia, Turkey and in NW Iran.

Habitat

Subspecies
''Chersotis rectangula rectangula 
''Chersotis rectangula subrectangula (Staudinger, 1871) (Turkey)

Bibliography
 Erstbeschreibung: (1775): Ankündung eines systematischen Werkes von den Schmetterlingen der Wienergegend herausgegeben von einigen Lehrern am k. k. Theresianum. 1-323, pl. I a+b, Frontispiz. Wien (Augustin Bernardi).
 Sviridov, A. V., Noctuid moths (Lepidoptera) new for different areas of the Russian Federation, 1. 2002

References

External links
 Lepiforum
 Lepi Net

Noctuinae
Moths of Europe
Moths of Asia
Moths described in 1775